Clement Pemberton Deykin (1 October 1877 – 14 March 1969) was a British rugby union player who competed in the 1900 Summer Olympics. He was born in Lapley, Staffordshire, and played for Moseley Wanderers RFC. He was a member of the British rugby union team, which won the silver medal. He died in Victoria, British Columbia, Canada.

References

External links
 Clement Deykin's profile at databaseOlympics
 Clement Deykin's profile at Sports Reference.com

1877 births
1969 deaths
British rugby union players
Rugby union players at the 1900 Summer Olympics
Olympic rugby union players of Great Britain
Olympic silver medallists for Great Britain
Medalists at the 1900 Summer Olympics
People from Staffordshire (before 1974)